Mary Jane Gillett, née Douglas (born 9 October 1958) is a former Australian politician.

Born in Sydney, New South Wales, she graduated from Young High School in 1974 and received a Bachelor of Arts from the Australian National University in 1979. That year, she became a clerk in the Australian Taxation Office; in 1982 she became associate to Mr N. Taylor of the Australian Industrial Relations Commission, and in 1985 became National Industrial Officer with the Commonwealth Foremans' Association. In 1987 she became National Industrial Officer of the National Union of Workers.

Political career
In 1996, Gillett was elected to the Victorian Legislative Assembly as the Labor member for Werribee. Her seat was abolished in 2002 and she transferred to Tarneit. During her tenure, she served multiple roles such as the Secretary for the Parliamentary Labor Party; Parliamentary Secretary for Volunteers; the 2006 Commonwealth Games, and Women's Affairs. In 2006 she was defeated for preselection by Tim Pallas, formerly chief of staff to Premier Steve Bracks, and Gillett retired from politics.

References

1958 births
Living people
Australian Labor Party members of the Parliament of Victoria
Members of the Victorian Legislative Assembly
21st-century Australian politicians
21st-century Australian women politicians
Women members of the Victorian Legislative Assembly